Soul Trombone is an album by American jazz trombonist Curtis Fuller featuring performances recorded in 1961 for the Impulse! label.

Reception
The Allmusic review by Ken Dryden awarded the album 4 stars stating "The solos on this hard bop disc are superb, with Fuller giving his musicians plenty of room, while his own work is first-rate. Three of the six pieces are originals and even if they never caught on, there is no filler present anywhere".

Track listing
All compositions by Curtis Fuller except as indicated
 "The Clan" – 6:19
 "In the Wee Small Hours of the Morning" (Bob Hilliard, David Mann) – 4:57
 "Newdles" – 7:40
 "The Breeze and I" (Ernesto Lecuona, Al Stillman) – 4:03
 "Dear Old Stockholm" (Traditional) – 9:07
 "Ladies' Night" – 6:30
Recorded on November 15, 1961 (track 1), November 16, 1961 (tracks 2 & 3), and November 17, 1961 (tracks 4-6)

Personnel
Curtis Fuller – trombone
Freddie Hubbard – trumpet
Jimmy Heath – tenor saxophone
Cedar Walton – piano
Jymie Merritt – bass
Jimmy Cobb (tracks 1-4,6), G. T. Hogan (track 5) – drums

References

Impulse! Records albums
Curtis Fuller albums
1961 albums
Albums produced by Bob Thiele
Albums recorded at Van Gelder Studio